Chasing Me to My Grave: An Artist's Memoir of the Jim Crow South is a 2021 memoir by artist Winfred Rembert written in collaboration with philosophy professor Erin I. Kelly. It won the 2022 Pulitzer Prize for Biography or Autobiography.

References

Further reading

External links 
 

2021 non-fiction books
English-language books
Bloomsbury Publishing books
American memoirs
Jim Crow